Francesco "Checco" Bruni (born 11 April 1973) is a professional sailor from Italy, together with James Spithill, helmsman of Luna Rossa during the America's Cup 2021.

He is the brother of the sailor Gabriele Bruni with whom he teamed up in 49er regattas during the 2000 Summer Olympics held in Sydney, Australia.

Biography
He has competed in the Summer Olympics three times, all in different classes. He finished 12th at the 1996 Olympics in a Laser, 11th at the 2000 Olympics in a 49er and 7th at the 2004 Olympics in the Star class.

Bruni raced with Luna Rossa Challenge at the 2003 and 2007 Louis Vuitton Cups.
He skippered the Azzurra team during the 2009 and 2010 Louis Vuitton Trophy events and with Team Synergy in the 2010 Louis Vuitton Trophy Dubai, before re-joining to Luna Rossa Challenge for the 2011–13 America's Cup World Series and 2013 Louis Vuitton Cup. When Luna Rossa withdrew from the 2017 America's Cup, Bruni joined Artemis Racing for the 2015–16 America's Cup World Series.

He has also won the 2010 Congressional Cup, 2011 Match Race Germany and 2013 King Edward VII Gold Cup.

Achievements

See also
 Luna Rossa Challenge
 2021 Prada Cup
 Italy at the America's Cup

References

External links
 

1973 births
Living people
Sailors at the 1996 Summer Olympics – Laser
Sailors at the 2000 Summer Olympics – 49er
Sailors at the 2004 Summer Olympics – Star
Olympic sailors of Italy
Italian male sailors (sport)
Luna Rossa Challenge sailors
Artemis Racing sailors
2003 America's Cup sailors
2007 America's Cup sailors
2013 America's Cup sailors
2021 America's Cup sailors
Competitors at the 1993 Mediterranean Games
Mediterranean Games gold medalists for Italy
21st-century Italian people